Normanby is a small village in South Taranaki, New Zealand. It is approximately 6 km inland from Hawera along State Highway 3. Eltham is 13 km further north.

The village is also situated on the Marton - New Plymouth Line railway, which has been freight-only through Normanby since the cessation of passenger railcar services between Wellington and New Plymouth on 30 July 1977.

The town was founded at the site of the Waihi redoubt, which was established as a field headquarters in September 1866 by colonial military forces fighting Hauhau Māori in the Second Taranaki War

Demographics

The population of Normanby was 1029 in the 2018 New Zealand census, an increase of 138 (15.5%) since the 2013 census, and an increase of 183 (21.6%) since the 2006 census. There were 519 males and 510 females, giving a sex ratio of 1.02 males per female. Ethnicities were 765 people  (74.3%) European/Pākehā, 411 (39.9%) Māori, and 39 (3.8%) Pacific peoples (totals add to more than 100% since people could identify with multiple ethnicities). Of the total population, 279 people  (27.1%) were under 15 years old, 186 (18.1%) were 15–29, 468 (45.5%) were 30–64, and 99 (9.6%) were over 65.

Normanby-Tawhiti

Normanby-Tawhiti had a population of 1,755 at the 2018 New Zealand census, an increase of 261 people (17.5%) since the 2013 census, and an increase of 375 people (27.2%) since the 2006 census. There were 597 households. There were 894 males and 861 females, giving a sex ratio of 1.04 males per female. The median age was 34.9 years (compared with 37.4 years nationally), with 456 people (26.0%) aged under 15 years, 288 (16.4%) aged 15 to 29, 831 (47.4%) aged 30 to 64, and 180 (10.3%) aged 65 or older.

Ethnicities were 79.8% European/Pākehā, 31.1% Māori, 3.4% Pacific peoples, 0.5% Asian, and 1.7% other ethnicities (totals add to more than 100% since people could identify with multiple ethnicities).

The proportion of people born overseas was 5.5%, compared with 27.1% nationally.

Although some people objected to giving their religion, 57.1% had no religion, 30.1% were Christian and 3.1% had other religions.

Of those at least 15 years old, 105 (8.1%) people had a bachelor or higher degree, and 375 (28.9%) people had no formal qualifications. The median income was $34,800, compared with $31,800 nationally. The employment status of those at least 15 was that 753 (58.0%) people were employed full-time, 180 (13.9%) were part-time, and 51 (3.9%) were unemployed.

Ketemarae Pa

Located near Normanby is Ketemarae Pa, a local historic centre for Maori settlement. It is an entry point for the Whakaahurangi track to Kairoa Pa, near Lepperton.  This track linked northern and southern Taranaki before British settlement.

The site includes the meeting houses of Kumea Mai te Waka and Te Manawanui, and is a meeting place for the Ngāti Ruanui hapū of Araukūku.

In October 2020, the Government committed $1,479,479 from the Provincial Growth Fund to renovate Meremere Marae, Ketemarae Pā, Pariroa Marae and Taiporohēnui Marae, creating 35 jobs.

Education

Normanby School is a coeducational contributing primary (years 1–6) school with a roll of  students as of  The school was established in 1876.

References

Further reading

External links
Statistics NZ: Normanby Community Profile

Populated places in Taranaki
South Taranaki District